Sosnovy Bor is an urban locality (a work settlement) in Sebezhsky District of Pskov Oblast, Russia, located southwest of the town of Sebezh and immediately west of Sebezhsky National Park. Municipally, it is incorporated as Sosnovy Bor Urban Settlement, one of the three urban settlements in the district. Population: 2,877 (2010 Census); 1,860 (2002 Census).

History
Sosnovy Bor was founded in 1959 as Sebezh-5. It was a settlement serving a secret military installation. On September 1, 1997, the installation was abolished in accordance with the START II treaty. On December 18, 1997, Sebezh-5 was renamed Sosnovy Bor and transformed into a work settlement. The military facilities were transferred to the Ministry of Internal Affairs to be used as a prison.

In 2006, Sosnovy Bor was included into a border security zone, intended to protect the borders of Russia from unwanted activity, but in 2007 it was removed from the zone.

Economy
Sosnovy Bor is a location of a large prison and provides the corresponding infrastructure.

Transportation
Sosnovy Bor is connected by a road with Sebezh. It is the terminal point of the road.

References

Notes

Sources

Urban-type settlements in Pskov Oblast